Saw Pyei Chantha was a Burmese royal title. It may refer to:

 Saw Pyei Chantha:  Queen consort of Arakan (r. 1408), Queen consort of Hanthawaddy (r. 1408–1421)
 Saw Pyei Chantha of Taungdwin:  Duchess of Taungdwin (r. 1441–1470s); Duchess of Toungoo (r. 1459–1466)